Seneley Green is a civil parish in St Helens, Merseyside, England.  It contains six buildings that are recorded in the National Heritage List for England as designated listed buildings, all of which are listed at Grade II.  This grade is the lowest of the three gradings given to listed buildings and is applied to "buildings of national importance and special interest".  The parish contains the village of Garswood, and is otherwise rural.  The listed buildings consist of houses, a church, and a former grammar school now used as a library.

References

Citations

Sources

Listed buildings in Merseyside
Lists of listed buildings in Merseyside
Buildings and structures in the Metropolitan Borough of St Helens